Cardboard Justice is a term conceptualised by Hope Swann, a teacher from De La Salle University in Manila, Philippines. The context of coining this term is the extrajudicial killings of criminals especially the drug peddlers in Philippines. The term is derived from a practice of some vigilante groups leaving a cardboard on the slain person with "Pusher Ako" written on it. Adrienne Onday, a researcher and feminist activist, back then a student from the University of the Philippines was inspired by Hope Swann which made her travel from Quezon City to Manila with a cardboard with “Lahat tayo posibleng drug pusher” . The movement took off in Philippines with many youngsters protesting against Cardboard Justice being carried out across the country.

See also
Philippine Drug War

References

Murder in the Philippines
Extrajudicial killings
Vigilantism
Drug-related deaths in the Philippines